A serial cable is a cable used to transfer information between two devices using a serial communication protocol. The form of connectors depends on the particular serial port used. A cable wired for connecting two DTEs directly is known as a null modem cable.

Maximum cable lengths
The maximum working length of a cable varies depending on the characteristics of the transmitters and receivers, the baud rate on the cable, and the capacitance and electrical impedance of the cable. The RS-232 standard states that a compliant port must provide defined signal characteristics for a capacitive load of  pF. This does not correspond to a fixed length of cable since varying cables have different characteristics. Empirically tested combinations of bit rate, serial ports, cable type, and lengths may provide reliable communications, but generally RS-232-compatible ports are intended to be connected by, at the most, a few tens of metres of cable. Other serial communications standards are better adapted to drive hundreds or thousands of metres of cable.

See also

 Direct cable connection
 InterLnk
 LapLink cable (can be seen as a parallel equivalent to a serial null modem cable)
 Legacy port
 Ethernet crossover cable
 Rollover cable (also known as a “Yost” cable.)
 USB adapter

References
Serial Cables pinouts and specifications
Pinouts of various serial interfaces

Telecommunications equipment